Helenium virus S (HVS) is a plant pathogenic virus.

External links
Family Groups - The Baltimore Method

Carlaviruses
Viral plant pathogens and diseases